Chinese Iranian or Iranian Chinese may refer to:
China-Iran relations
Chinese people in Iran
Iranians in China, such as:
An Shih Kao
An Hsuan
Karen Mok (mother is fourth-Persian half-Chinese)
Tajiks of Xinjiang people of Chinese and Iranian descent